Events in the year 1925 in the British Mandate of Palestine.

Incumbents
 High Commissioner – Sir Herbert Louis Samuel until 30 June; Herbert Onslow Plumer
 Emir of Transjordan – Abdullah I bin al-Hussein
 Prime Minister of Transjordan – 'Ali Rida Basha al-Rikabi

Events

 6 February – The official opening ceremony of the Technion – Israel Institute of Technology.
 1 April – The Hebrew University of Jerusalem campus on Mount Scopus is opened at a gala ceremony attended by the leaders of the Jewish world, distinguished scholars and public figures, and British dignitaries, including the Earl of Balfour, Viscount Allenby and Sir Herbert Samuel.
 1 May – The founding of the kibbutz Givat HaShlosha by group of Jewish immigrants from Poland.
 1 June – The first edition of the Hebrew-language daily newspaper "Davar" is published under the name Davar – Iton Poalei Eretz Yisrael (lit. Davar – Newspaper of Eretz Yisrael Workers).
 6 December – Second Assembly of Jewish Representatives elected.

Unknown dates
 The founding of the moshav Ramatayim, one of the four original communities of Jewish agriculturalists that combined in 1964 to form Hod Hasharon.

Notable births

 6 January – Uzi Narkiss, Israeli general (died 1997).
29 January – Nathan Shaham, Israeli writer (died 2018)
 10 March – Mordechai Alkahi, Irgun member and one of the Olei Hagardom (died 1947).
 9 April – Kamal Nasser, Palestinian Arab politician, PLO leader, writer and poet (died 1973).
 14 May – Yuval Ne'eman, Israeli physicist, politician, and President of Tel Aviv University (died 2006).
 25 May – Moshe Gidron, Israeli military officer, major general in the IDF (died 2009).
 7 June – Reuven Shefer, Israeli actor (died 2011).
 24 August – Chaim Yaakov Goldvicht, Israeli rabbi, founding rosh yeshiva of Yeshivat Kerem B'Yavneh (died 1995).
 25 August – Yeshayahu Gavish, Israeli general
 2 November – Aryeh Nehemkin, Israeli politician.
 29 November – Zvi Zibel, Israeli soldier, posthumous recipient of the Hero of Israel award (died 1948).
 1 December – Dov Levin, Israeli jurist, judge on the Supreme Court of Israel (died 2001).
 24 December – Yafa Yarkoni, Israeli singer (died 2012).
 25 December – Geulah Cohen, former Israeli politician and journalist (died 2019)
 25 December – Shabtai Teveth, Israeli historian (died 2014).
 Full date unknown''
 Shlomo Moussaieff, Israeli jeweler (died 2015).
 Walid Khalidi, Palestinian Arab historian who has written extensively on the Palestinian exodus.
 Yechiel Fishel Eisenbach, Israeli rabbi (died 2008).

Notable deaths

References

 
Palestine
Years in Mandatory Palestine